PUP is the debut album by Canadian punk rock band PUP. The album was recorded with the financial support of the Government of Canada through the Department of Canadian Heritage (Canada Music Fund) and Canada's Private Radio Broadcasters. PUP was released on October 8, 2013 through Royal Mountain Records in Canada and later re-released on April 8, 2014 through SideOneDummy Records.

Track listing

Personnel
PUP
Stefan Babcock – lead vocals, rhythm guitar
Nestor Chumak – bass, backing vocals
Zack Mykula – drums, backing vocals
Steve Sladkowski – lead guitar, backing vocals

Others
Dave Schiffman – recording, mixing
Francis Belanger Lacas – recording assistant
Spencer Sunshine – additional recording
Howie Weinberg – mastering (at 'Howie Weinberg Mastering Studio', Los Angeles)
Jason Bartell – cover art

References

PUP (band) albums
2013 debut albums
SideOneDummy Records albums
Royal Mountain Records albums